
Gmina Warnice is a rural gmina (administrative district) in Pyrzyce County, West Pomeranian Voivodeship, in north-western Poland.

Villages
Gmina Warnice contains the villages and settlements of Barnim, Cieszysław, Dębica, Grędziec, Janowo, Kłęby, Nowy Przylep, Obryta, Reńsko, Stary Przylep, Warnice, Wierzbno, Wójcin and Zaborsko.

Neighbouring gminas
Gmina Warnice is bordered by the town of Stargard and by the gminas of Dolice, Przelewice, Pyrzyce, Stare Czarnowo and Stargard.

References
Polish official population figures 2006

Warnice
Pyrzyce County